Friðrik Karlsson is an Icelandic musician and songwriter.  He studied classical and jazz/rock guitar and had success with the group Mezzoforte in 1983 with the U.K. top 20 hit, "Garden Party".  He has contributed to the soundtracks of musicals such as Jesus Christ Superstar and Saturday Night Fever and to that of movies such as Evita and Hercules.  His TV work includes accompanying singers Madonna, José Carreras and Tom Jones.  Karlsson has also appeared on albums and singles from Boyzone and Cliff Richard, among others.  Karlsson has moved back home to his native Iceland, after living in London, where he among other jobs worked as a session musician playing guitar in the musical Jesus Christ Superstar.  He has released numerous new-age and relaxation music albums known as "The Feel Good Collection". In 2014, Karlsson also played as session musician for Kate Bush's first live performances in 35 years, playing guitar for 22 dates.

Albums

References

Living people
Year of birth missing (living people)
Icelandic guitarists
Male guitarists
Mezzoforte (band) members
Eurovision Song Contest entrants of 1992
Eurovision Song Contest entrants for Iceland